"Tell Me If You Like It" is the debut and only single by Australian singer Danielle Stearman (under the mononymous name of Danielle), who appeared on the third series of Australian Popstars in 2002. The song peaked at number 20 on the ARIA charts.

Track listings
 Main single (0927481932)
 "Tell Me If You Like It" - 3:29
 "Piece of My Heart" -	3:50
 "Superstition" (Felix Remix) - 7:32

 The Remixes (0927488982)
 "Tell Me If You Like It" (Supafly Radio Remix)
 "Tell Me If You Like It" (Deep 'N Dark Remix)
 "Tell Me If You Like It" (Supafly Dub Mix)
 "Tell Me If You Like It" (Supafly Club Mix)

Charts

References

2002 singles
2002 songs
Warner Records singles